Vojtěch Heger (born 23 August 2000) is a Czech slalom canoeist who has competed at the international level since 2016. Heger competes in the C1 class and in Extreme slalom, having initially competed in C2 alongside his older brother Tomáš and later with Antonie Galušková.

Heger began paddling with KVS Hradec Králové in 2005, following his mother and brother into the sport. He moved to Brandýs nad Labem in 2015 and then to Prague, home of the Prague-Troja Canoeing Centre. He is currently studying physical education at Charles University.

He won a silver medal in the C1 team event at the 2021 World Championships in Bratislava alongside Lukáš Rohan and Václav Chaloupka, ending a seven year drought for the Czech Republic in C1M events at the World Championships. He became U23 European Champion in the C1 event in 2020 in Kraków and vice-champion a year later in Solkan.

At the 2019 World Championships in La Seu d'Urgell, Heger finished 13th, securing an Olympic quota for the Czech Republic in the C1 event. He lost out in domestic selections to eventual silver medallist Lukáš Rohan, being named Olympic substitute.

Heger won the overall World Cup title in Extreme K1 in 2022. He finished 10th in the overall World Cup standings in the C1 class in 2021.

Results

World Cup individual podiums

Complete World Cup results

Notes
No overall rankings were determined by the ICF, with only two races possible due to the COVID-19 pandemic.

References

External links

2000 births
Living people
Czech male canoeists
Sportspeople from Hradec Králové
Medalists at the ICF Canoe Slalom World Championships
Charles University alumni